Rosalyn H. Baker (born September 20, 1946) is an American politician. She has been a Democratic member of the Hawaii Senate for District 6 since January 16, 2013. Baker served consecutively from 2003 until 2013 in the District 5 seat, and previously served from 1993 until 1999, having served consecutively in the Hawaii State Legislature from 1989 until 1993 in the Hawaii House of Representatives. Baker was appointed to the Senate in 1993 and currently serves as the Senate Chair of Commerce and Consumer Protection.

Early life
Baker was born on September 20, 1946, in El Campo, Texas. She graduated from Southwest Texas State University (now Texas State University) with a bachelors of arts degree in political science and speech in 1968 and received a masters of arts degree from the University of Southwestern Louisiana (now the University of Louisiana at Lafayette) in 1969. She was a lobbyist and assistant director of the National Education Association in Washington D.C. She worked as the owner of a sporting goods store in Maui from 1980 to 1987.

Political career
Baker was first elected to the Hawaii House of Representatives in the 1988 general election. During her first term, she was appointed as the House majority leader. She was re-elected in 1990. Baker won the three-way 1992 Democratic primary with 2,431 votes, and won the general election with 4,340 votes (66.0%) against Republican Gene Viglione.

Baker was appointed to the Hawaii Senate in 1993 by Governor John Waihee, taking over from Senator Russell Blair in District 4. She won the 1994 Democratic primary with 3,828 votes (53.1%) against Jan Buen, and won the general election with 9,418 votes (74.6%) against Republican Zane Dittman. In 1998, Baker lost the primary to Buen, who held the seat from 1999 until 2003. She was redistricted to District 5 in 2002 and with Senator J. Kalani English redistricted to District 6, Baker ran unopposed in the Democratic primary, winning with 2,107 votes. She won the general election with 5,556 votes (49.1%) against Republican nominee Don Couch. In 2004, Baker and Couch were both unopposed in their primaries, setting up a rematch. She once again won the general election, with 8,271 votes (56.3%) against Couch. Baker won the 2008 primary with 2,646 votes (67.2%), and won the general election with 8,506 votes (53.7%) against Republican nominee Jan Shields.

In 2012, Baker was redistricted to District 6, and with English redistricted to District 7, Baker was unopposed in the August primary, winning with 3,457 votes, and won the general election with 9,808 votes (67.3%) against Republican nominee Bart Mulvihill, her primary challenger from 2008, having changed parties.

Baker announced at the end of the 2022 legislative session that she will be retiring from the Legislature, and will not run in the 2022 Hawaii Senate election.

References

External links
Official page at the Hawaii State Legislature
Campaign site
 

1946 births
Living people
People from El Campo, Texas
People from Lahaina, Hawaii
Texas State University alumni
University of Louisiana at Lafayette alumni
Democratic Party Hawaii state senators
Democratic Party members of the Hawaii House of Representatives
Women state legislators in Hawaii
21st-century American politicians
21st-century American women politicians